The 2016–17 Montana Lady Griz basketball team represents the University of Montana during the 2016–17 NCAA Division I women's basketball season. The Lady Griz will play their home games at Dahlberg Arena and were members of the Big Sky Conference. They finished the season 7–23, 4–14 in Big Sky play to finish in eleventh place. They lost in the first round of the Big Sky women's tournament to Idaho State.

On July 27, 2016, longtime head coach Robin Selvig announced his retirement effective August 31. Assistant coach Shannon Schweyen will assume head coaching duties.

Roster

Schedule
Source 

|-
!colspan=9 style="background:#660033; color:#999999;"| Exhibition

|-
!colspan=9 style="background:#660033; color:#999999;"| Non-conference regular season

|-
!colspan=9 style="background:#660033; color:#999999;"| Big Sky regular season

|-
!colspan=9 style="background:#660033; color:#848482;"| Big Sky Women's Tournament

See also
 2016–17 Montana Grizzlies basketball team

References

Montana Lady Griz basketball seasons
Montana
Lady
Lady